Marion College was a Lutheran junior women's college that operated in Marion, Virginia, from 1873 to 1967.

Roanoke College, a sister Lutheran college, adopted Marion's alumnae and maintains their records. Marion's alumnae have a reunion every other year on the Roanoke campus. Roanoke's Marion Hall, constructed in 1968 as a women's residence hall, is named in honor of Marion College.

Notable alumnae
Brenda Holsinger Schwarzkopf, wife of Gen. Norman Schwarzkopf

References

Defunct private universities and colleges in Virginia
Lutheran universities and colleges in the United States
Lutheranism in Virginia
Educational institutions established in 1873
Educational institutions disestablished in 1967
1967 disestablishments in the United States
Two-year colleges in the United States
1873 establishments in Virginia